This is a list of football seasons completed by the East Carolina Pirates since the team's creation in 1932 under Coach Kenneth Beatty. Since that first season, the Pirates have played over 800 regular-season games and 20 bowl games.

Historically, East Carolina has seen moderate success. While East Carolina's first ten years of football included only three winning seasons, the team has recorded one undefeated season and a share of the Small College National Championship in 1941, along with several one-loss seasons since their early struggles.  Football was called off for the 1942, 1943, and 1944 seasons due to World War II.  After the three-season hiatus, the Pirates joined the North State Conference. East Carolina won its first championship—the North State Conference championship—in 1953.  In its 15 years as a member of the North State Conference, the Pirates won two championships and went to two bowl games.  In 1962, the team left the conference and returned to its previous status as a football independent. During two of those years, the Pirates went 9–1.

In 1965, the Pirates accepted membership in the Southern Conference. The team won the Southern Conference championship under coach Clarence Stasavich in the following year, but did not win another conference championship until 1972. The 1972 team was coached by Sonny Randle, who won the Southern Conference championship in his second year as head coach.  In 1973, he again coached a conference-championship team—the only time in school history the team won two conference championships in a row. Randle left to take a position as head football coach of Virginia in 1974 and was replaced by Pat Dye. Dye, in his third year, won the Pirates' fourth Southern Conference championship.  In 1977, ECU left the Southern Conference and had three more winning seasons as a football independent. In 1980, under new head coach Ed Emory, the Pirates had their first losing season since 1971.  The team struggled over the next two years.  In 1983, Emory's Pirates ended the season ranked as one of the top 25 teams in the country by the Associated Press.

The next seven seasons included just one winning season—1989.  The Pirates gradually rebuilt the program, and the 1991 team, coached by Bill Lewis, went 11–1, losing only to Illinois in the season opener. The team capped off the season with an in-state win over North Carolina State in the Peach Bowl.  Following the win, the Pirates entered the offseason ranked ninth in both the AP and Coaches Poll.  Thanks to his performance during the year, Lewis was awarded the American Football Coaches Association Coach of the Year award. The season marked the only time the Pirates finished the season ranked in the top 10.  In 1995, ECU won the Liberty Bowl over Stanford and finished 23rd in the Coaches' Poll.  The Pirates joined Conference USA (C-USA) in 1997, ending their status as football independents for the first time since 1976.  Since joining the C-USA, the Pirates have had nine winning seasons, seven losing seasons, and one 6–6 year. In 2014, the Pirates joined the American Athletic Conference as full members.

Seasons

References

General

Specific

External links
ECUPirates.com – Official East Carolina Pirates football website

 
East Carolina
East Carolina Pirates football seasons